iTunes Session is a live EP by the British virtual band Gorillaz that was released exclusively through iTunes on 22 October 2010.

Track listing

Charts

References 

Gorillaz albums
Parlophone EPs
Virgin Records EPs
2010 EPs